Kenneth Senior (birth unknown) is an English former professional rugby league footballer who played in the 1960s and 1970s.

International honours
On 3 April 1965, Senior played in the first ever Great Britain under-24 international match in a 17–9 win against France under-24's.

Senior won caps for Great Britain while at Huddersfield in 1965 against New Zealand, and in 1967 against France.

References

External links
!Great Britain Statistics at englandrl.co.uk (statistics currently missing due to not having appeared for both Great Britain, and England)
Photograph "Ramsey leads the players off" at rlhp.co.uk

Living people
English rugby league players
Great Britain national rugby league team players
Huddersfield Giants players
Place of birth missing (living people)
Rugby league wingers
Year of birth missing (living people)
Yorkshire rugby league team players